The winner of the previous two editions, Lucien Mazan "Petit-Breton", did not compete in the 1909 Tour de France. Petit-Breton expected his former teammate François Faber, who had become second in 1908, to win the race. Faber had transferred from the Peugeot team, that had dominated the 1908 edition, to the Alcyon team.

A new record of 150 cyclists started the race.  The previous Tours had been successful, and similar races were initiated in other countries (most notably the Tour of Belgium, which started in 1908 and the Giro d'Italia, which started in 1909). The Tour de France was still the major race where the best cyclists came, and it was the first large-scale invasion of foreign stars. In total, 19 Italians, 5 Belgians, 4 Swiss, 1 German and 1 Luxembourgian started the race.
Because cyclists could enter the race  as sponsored cyclists, there were two classes of cyclists: cyclists with sponsors and cyclists without sponsors. There were seven different sponsors in the race (Nil-Supra, Alcyon, Biguet-Dunlop, Le Globe, Atala, Legnano and Felsina), with three to six cyclists. The majority of the cyclists, 112 in total, were not sponsored but were in the Isolé class, the class for cyclists without a sponsor.

Cyclists

By team

By starting number

By nationality

References

1909 Tour de France
1909